Contingent sovereignty refers to the new and still evolving theory which challenges the norm of non-intervention in the internal affairs of countries, commonly associated with the Westphalian doctrine of sovereignty.

In 2007, Stewart Patrick of the United States State Department described the contingent sovereignty as follows.

The concept of contingent sovereignty is evolving and currently not codified in international law.

Criticism

Critics argue that the concept of contingent sovereignty allows powerful countries, such as the United States, too much scope to invade other countries based in their own judgements about the human rights abuses or other wrongdoing of the government of the country concerned.

See also
Responsibility to protect
Humanitarian intervention
Sovereignty
Just War theory

References

Political terminology
Diplomacy
Sovereignty